The 2014 season was Pahang FA's 11th season in the Liga Super.

Competitions

Liga Super

League table

Piala FA

Piala Malaysia

Group stage

Sri Pahang FC
Sri Pahang FC seasons
2014 in Malaysian football
Malaysian football clubs 2014 season